Ertan Yuzeir Tombak (born  1 January 1999) is a Bulgarian footballer who plays as a right back for Slavia Sofia.

Career

Cherno More
On 31 May 2017, Tombak made his professional début in a 2–2 away draw against Levski Sofia, playing full 90 minutes. On 6 July 2017, he signed his first professional contract. Tombak publicly expressed his delight and stated that being part of the first team was a "dream come true".

On 6 October 2018 he announced his retirement from football to go to university in Sofia.

Slavia Sofia
In the fall of 2018 Tombak participated in some training sessions with Slavia Sofia, but from the team it was clarified that he was training just to keep in shape. Nevertheless, on 9 January 2019 Slavia officially announced Tombak as their first winter signing.
Tombak is a fan favorite of the Dutch Slavia Fan Club.

International career
Tombak was called-up for the Bulgaria U18 squad for the friendlies against Macedonia U18 on 9 and 11 May 2017. On 12 September 2017, he made his debut for Bulgaria U19 in a friendly against Bosnia and Herzegovina U19. He scored his first goal for the Bulgaria U21 national side on 17 November 2020, in the 3:0 home win over Estonia U21 in a UEFA European Championship qualifier.

Career statistics

References

External links

1999 births
Living people
Sportspeople from Varna, Bulgaria
Bulgarian footballers
Bulgarian people of Turkish descent
Bulgaria youth international footballers
Association football fullbacks
First Professional Football League (Bulgaria) players
PFC Cherno More Varna players
PFC Slavia Sofia players